The 1924 LSU Tigers football team represented Louisiana State University (LSU) in the 1924 college football season.  LSU moved to its new home in Tiger Stadium for the last game of the 1924 season.

Schedule

References

LSU
LSU Tigers football seasons
LSU Tigers football